The Mid South Eastern Football League is an Australian rules football competition based in the Limestone Coast region of South Australia.  It is an affiliated member of the South Australian National Football League.

Clubs

Current

Previous

Premiers 

 1936 GLENCOE FC
 1937 MILLICENT CENTRALS FC
 1938 MILLICENT CENTRALS FC
 1939 MILLICENT CENTRALS FC
 1940 SEASON ABANDONED
 1946 MILLICENT FC
 1947 TANTANOOLA FC
 1948 TANTANOOLA FC
 1949 GLENCOE FC
 1950 KALANGADOO FC
 1951 KALANGADOO FC
 1952 KALANGADOO FC
 1953 GLENCOE FC
 1954 GLENCOE FC
 1955 GLENCOE FC
 1956 KALANGADOO FC
 1957 GLENCOE FC
 1958 KALANGADOO FC
 1959 MOUNT BURR FC
 1960 MOUNT BURR FC
 1961 TARPEENA FC
 1962 GLENCOE FC
 1963 GLENCOE FC
 1964 PORT MACDONNELL FC
 1965 MOUNT BURR FC

 1966 GLENCOE FC
 1967 GLENCOE FC
 1968 ROBE FC
 1969 MOUNT BURR FC
 1970 MOUNT BURR FC
 1971 HATHERLEIGH FC
 1972 KONGORONG FC
 1973 TANTANOOLA FC
 1974 TARPEENA FC
 1975 TANTANOOLA FC
 1976 MOUNT BURR FC
 1977 MOUNT BURR FC
 1978 MOUNT BURR FC
 1979 PORT MACDONNELL FC
 1980 KONGORONG FC
 1981 KONGORONG FC
 1982 KALANGADOO FC
 1983 KALANGADOO FC
 1984 KALANGADOO FC
 1985 GLENCOE FC
 1986 TANTANOOLA FC
 1987 ROBE FC
 1988 KONGORONG FC
 1989 MOUNT BURR FC
 1990 MOUNT BURR FC

 1991 GLENCOE FC
 1992 GLENCOE FC
 1993 NANGWARRY FC
 1994 NANGWARRY FC
 1995 MOUNT BURR FC
 1996 MOUNT BURR FC
 1997 NANGWARRY FC
 1998 PORT MACDONNELL FC
 1999 NANGWARRY FC
 2000 MOUNT BURR FC
 2001 KALANGADOO FC
 2002 HATHERLEIGH FC
 2003 ROBE FC
 2004 GLENCOE FC
 2005 HATHERLEIGH FC
 2006 TANTANOOLA FC
 2007 GLENCOE FC
 2008 HATHERLEIGH FC
 2009 MOUNT BURR FC 
 2010 MOUNT BURR FC
 2011 MOUNT BURR FC
 2012 PORT MACDONNELL FC
 2013 HATHERLEIGH FC
 2014 KALANGADOO FC
 2015 MOUNT BURR FC

 2016 MOUNT BURR FC
 2017 MOUNT BURR FC
 2018 ROBE FC
 2019 KALANGADOO FC
 2020 SEASON ABANDONED
 2021 PORT MACDONNELL FC

Brief history 
The Mid South East Football League formed in 1936 with founding clubs being Glencoe, Kalangadoo, Millicent Centrals (now known as Mount Burr), Millicent Rovers and Tantanoola.  Millicent Rovers changed their name to Millicent in 1946, then in 1947 moved to the Mount Gambier & District FL, which later became part of the Western Border Football League.

2006
In 2006 Tantanoola Football Club were premiers, defeating Hatherleigh Football Club.

2007
In 2007 Glencoe Football Club were the premiers beating Tantanoola in the Grand Final.
Mt Burr Senior Colts were also Premiers beating Robe in the Final.

2020
In 2020 the season was abandoned because of the COVID-19 pandemic.

Notable players 
 Darren Mansell Tarpeena
 Luke Panozzo, Toby Pink Tantanoola
 John Seebohm, Ryan Gamble, Brad Agnew, Henry Crauford Mount Burr
 Jordan Murdoch, Brodie Murdoch Port MacDonnell
 Jordan Dawson Robe
 Ben Mules Kalangadoo
 Warrick McGinty Kongorong

References

External links 
 Footypedia - MSEFL
 country footy

Books
 Encyclopedia of South Australian country football clubs / compiled by Peter Lines. 
 South Australian country football digest / by Peter Lines 

Australian rules football competitions in South Australia